The MM/SPQ-2 was an Italian naval radar produced by SMA. It was a multifunction radar performing the functions of surface and low altitude search as well as navigation. It was developed into the MM/SPS-702 and MM/SPS-703.

References

Military radars of Italy
Naval radars
Cold War military equipment of Italy
Military equipment introduced in the 1950s